The Briefing: Politics, the Press, and the President is a 2018 book by former White House Press Secretary Sean Spicer.

References

External links
After Words interview with Spicer on The Briefing, July 28, 2018, C-SPAN

2018 non-fiction books
American autobiographies
Books about the Trump administration
Biteback Publishing books
Regnery Publishing books